Heath Richards (born 1 March 2001) is a South African cricketer. He made his Twenty20 debut for South Western Districts in the 2019–20 CSA Provincial T20 Cup on 13 September 2019. He made his first-class debut on 3 October 2019, for South Western Districts in the 2019–20 CSA 3-Day Provincial Cup. He made his List A debut on 6 October 2019, for South Western Districts in the 2019–20 CSA Provincial One-Day Challenge.

References

External links
 

2001 births
Living people
South African cricketers
South Western Districts cricketers
Place of birth missing (living people)